Hugo Dansey Butler (4 May 1914 – 7 January 1968) was a Canadian-born screenwriter working in Hollywood who was blacklisted by the film studios in the 1950s.

Biography
Born on 4 May 1914 in Calgary, Alberta, Canada, his father, Frank Russell Butler (December 28, 1889 — June 10, 1967), had acted and written scripts in silent films. His mother was Margaret Annie Dansey Addis (1891-19??).

Hugo Butler worked as a journalist and playwright before moving to Hollywood in 1937 where he wrote the first of his thirty-four screenplays. His work on Edison the Man (1940) led to his nomination (with Dore Schary) for the Best Writing, Original Story Academy Award.

In 1940, he married actress Jean Rouverol, later an author and screenwriter. The couple would have six children. On May 5, 1945, Butler enlisted in the United States Army during World War II.

After being blacklisted, he wrote under various pseudonyms as well as using a fellow member of the Writers Guild of America as a front to submit screenplays to the movie studios on his behalf. After being subpoenaed by the House Un-American Activities Committee (HUAC) in 1951, Butler and his family went to Mexico where he worked on scripts for directors Luis Buñuel, Carlos Velo and Robert Aldrich. He was a handful of blacklisted artists responsible for the Nuevo Cine movement in Mexico, according to Rebeca Shreiber's Cold War Exiles in Mexico. While living in Italy, he would also continue writing for Aldrich. They did not return to the United States on a permanent basis for thirteen years.

Death
Butler suffered from arteriosclerosis for several years before he died from a heart attack in January 1968 in Hollywood, California. He was survived by his wife Jean and six children, including screenwriter Michael Butler. His death occurred shortly before he was about to rise from the Hollywood blacklist after co-writing the 1968 film The Legend of Lylah Clare with his wife. 

In 1997, the Board of Directors of the Writers Guild of America voted to posthumously give him official credit for scripts he had written.

Butler's film Los Pequeños Gigantes was preserved by the Academy Film Archive in 2007.

Selected filmography
Edison the Man (story, 1940)
Blossoms in the Dust (1941)
 A Yank on the Burma Road (1942)
Lassie Come Home (1943)
The Southerner (1945)
Miss Susie Slagle's (1946)
From This Day Forward (1946)
A Woman of Distinction (1950)
He Ran All the Way (1951)
The Big Night (1951)
The Adventures of Robinson Crusoe (1954) directed by Luis Buñuel
Torero (1956)
Autumn Leaves (1956)
Los pequeños gigantes (1958)
La joven (The Young One, 1960) directed by Buñuel
The Legend of Lylah Clare (1968)

References

External links

1914 births
1968 deaths
American male screenwriters
Canadian expatriate writers in the United States
Hollywood blacklist
Writers from Calgary
20th-century American male writers
20th-century Canadian screenwriters
20th-century American screenwriters
United States Army soldiers